Prospect Bay is a rural community on the Chebucto Peninsula in the Halifax Regional Municipality on the shore of the Atlantic Ocean on the Prospect Bay Road off (Route 333), 22.9 kilometers from Halifax, Canada. There is no town centre. Major landmarks include The Bay Landing Boat Club and Lounge, Prospect Foods, and the Christopher Webb Art Gallery and Studio.

Communications 
 Telephone exchange 902 - 852
 First three digits of postal code - B3T

Demographics 
 Total Population  684
 Total Dwellings   294
 Total Land Area   8.435 km2

Communities in Halifax, Nova Scotia
General Service Areas in Nova Scotia